John Louis Johnson (born John Louis Mercer; November 18, 1869 – January 28, 1941) was an American left-handed pitcher who played briefly for the Philadelphia Phillies during the  season. Johnson was born in Pekin, Illinois.

In his major league career, Johnson posted a 1–1 record with a 6.06 ERA in four appearances, including three starts and two complete games, giving up 22 earned runs on 44 hits and 15 walks while striking out 10 in  innings of work.
 
Johnson died in Kansas City, Missouri at the age of 71.

External links

Philadelphia Phillies players
19th-century baseball players
Major League Baseball pitchers
Baseball players from Illinois
1869 births
1941 deaths
People from Pekin, Illinois
Ottumwa Coal Palaces players
Kansas City Blues (baseball) players
Topeka Capitols players
St. Joseph Saints players
Detroit Tigers (Western League) players
Dubuque (minor league baseball) players
Quincy Little Giants players